Tatjana Brnović  (born 9 November 1998) is a Montenegrin handball player who plays for Brest Bretagne Handball and the Montenegrin national team.

She was selected to represent Montenegro at the 2017 World Women's Handball Championship.

Achievements

Club
Montenegrin league:
Winner: 2018, 2019 (with ŽRK Budućnost Podgorica)
Montenegrin Cup
Winner: 2018, 2019 (with ŽRK Budućnost Podgorica)
Slovenian league:
Winner: 2022 (with RK Krim)
Slovenian Cup
Winner: 2022 (with RK Krim)

International
Olympic Games
2020: 6th

World Championship:
2017: 6th
2019: 5th

European Championship
2018: 9th
2022:

References

External links

1998 births
Living people
Montenegrin female handball players
Sportspeople from Cetinje
Olympic handball players of Montenegro
Handball players at the 2020 Summer Olympics